is a Japanese photographer.

In 2005 Nagakura's book Zabitto ikka, ie o tateru won the Kodansha Publishing Culture Award for a work of photography.

Notes

References
Nihon shashinka jiten / 328 Outstanding Japanese Photographers. Kyoto: Tankōsha, 2000. .  Despite the English-language alternative title, all in Japanese.

Japanese photographers
1952 births
Living people